Wahyu may refer to:

People
Given name
Wahyu Aditya (b. 1972), animator from Indonesia 
Wahyu Gunawan (b. 1985), Indonesian footballer

Surname
AA Ngurah Wahyu, Indonesian footballer 
F.X. Yanuar Wahyu, Indonesian footballer

Other uses
Taman Wahyu, a residential area in Kampung Batu, Kuala Lumpur, Malaysia